Timothy Wallace Credeur II (born July 9, 1977) is a retired American mixed martial artist. He was a cast member of Spike TV's The Ultimate Fighter 7 and was defeated by fellow cast member Jesse Taylor in the semi-finals. He was then brought back into the competition following the disqualification of Taylor. He fought C.B. Dollaway for a spot in the finals and lost to Dollaway via decision.

Mixed martial arts career

The Ultimate Fighter 7
Tim is a member of Louisiana's Gladiator Academy and appeared on "The Ultimate Fighter" series.
Tim advanced to the semifinals with victories over Erik Charles, Matthew Riddle, and Dan Cramer (all by submission). During the show's semi-final fight between him and Jesse Taylor, Taylor won by unanimous decision after 3 rounds. However, after Taylor was removed from the finale for disciplinary reasons, Credeur fought C.B. Dollaway to determine who would match up against Amir Sadollah in the show's live finale.

Tim lost the match by unanimous decision after 3 rounds, though the match was very closely contested.

UFC career
He was scheduled to fight fellow Team Forrest member Cale Yarbrough at the TUF 7 finale. However, Tim admitted to using the prescription drug Adderall five days prior to the event; Adderall is a drug banned by the Nevada State Athletic Commission. A drug test was performed and the prescription drug was still in Tim's system. As a result, the match was cancelled.

As Tim admitted to the recent use of the drug and he did not fight, there was no disciplinary action taken against him; his bout with Yarbrough was rescheduled for the UFC's July 19 show, UFC: Silva vs. Irvin.   This time the match did happen and Tim won by TKO at 1:54 of round 1. Tim took on Nate Loughran at UFC: Fight For The Troops, Tim beat Loughran, due to Loughran withdrawing at the end of round two.

His next fight would be against Nick Catone at UFC Fight Night: Condit vs. Kampmann which he won by Submission (Guillotine Choke) at 3:45 of round 2, giving him his third consecutive victory in the UFC.

Tim fought on the UFC Fight Night 19 card against former middleweight title contender Nate Quarry. Tim lost the fight by unanimous decision after winning the first round but losing the second and third. The fight was shown live and free on the main card. The fight earned Fight of the Night.

Credeur was scheduled to face Mike Massenzio at UFC Fight Night 20, but was replaced by fellow TUF castmate and UFC newcomer Gerald Harris after being forced off the card with an injury.

Credeur was scheduled to face Tom Lawlor on May 8, 2010 at UFC 113, but was forced off the card with another injury.  He was replaced by Joe Doerksen. Credeur later revealed that he was forced out of the scheduled UFC 113 bout due to an abnormality found during a brain scan.

Credeur faced Ed Herman on June 4, 2011 at The Ultimate Fighter 13 Finale.  He lost the fight via TKO in the first round.

Credeur was expected to face Brad Tavares on October 29, 2011 at UFC 137.  However, Creduer was forced out of the bout and replaced by promotional newcomer Dustin Jacoby.

In 2013 Credeur quietly retired from fighting to focus on teaching and coaching in his MMA gym in Lafayette, Louisiana.

Personal life
Credeur and his wife Mamie had their first child, a daughter named Audrey on January 4, 2011.

Mixed martial arts record

|-
| Loss
| align=center| 12–4
| Ed Herman
| TKO (punches)
| The Ultimate Fighter 13 Finale
| 
| align=center| 1
| align=center| 0:48
| Las Vegas, Nevada, United States
| 
|-
| Loss
| align=center| 12–3
| Nate Quarry
| Decision (unanimous)
| UFC Fight Night: Diaz vs. Guillard
| 
| align=center| 3
| align=center| 5:00
| Oklahoma City, Oklahoma, United States
| 
|-
| Win
| align=center| 12–2
| Nick Catone
| Submission (guillotine choke)
| UFC Fight Night: Condit vs. Kampmann
| 
| align=center| 2
| align=center| 3:45
| Nashville, Tennessee, United States
| 
|-
| Win
| align=center| 11–2
| Nate Loughran
| TKO (injury)
| UFC: Fight for the Troops
| 
| align=center| 2
| align=center| 5:00
| Fayetteville, North Carolina, United States
| 
|-
| Win
| align=center| 10–2
| Cale Yarbrough
| KO (punches)
| UFC Fight Night: Silva vs. Irvin
| 
| align=center| 1
| align=center| 1:54
| Las Vegas, Nevada, United States
| 
|-
| Win
| align=center| 9–2
| Chris Gates
| Submission (armbar)
| SCF: Punishment at the PMAC
| 
| align=center| 1
| align=center| 4:47
| Baton Rouge, Louisiana, United States
| 
|-
| Win
| align=center| 8–2
| Brandon McDowell
| Submission (triangle choke)
| IXFA: Revolution Fight Night
| 
| align=center| 1
| align=center| 1:35
| Lafayette, Louisiana, United States
| 
|-
| Win
| align=center| 7–2
| Josh Lawrence
| Submission (armbar)
| Universal Gladiator Championships 4
| 
| align=center| 1
| align=center| 4:43
| Kenner, Louisiana, United States
| 
|-
| Loss
| align=center| 6–2
| Chael Sonnen
| TKO (punches)
| Bodog Fight: Costa Rica
| 
| align=center| 1
| align=center| 2:18
| Costa Rica
| 
|-
| Win
| align=center| 6–1
| Edward Maxwell
| TKO
| ISCF: Rampage in the Cage 2
| 
| align=center| 1
| align=center| N/A
| Lafayette, Louisiana, United States
| 
|-
| Win
| align=center| 5–1
| Liam McCarty
| Submission (armbar)
| ISCF: Rampage in the Cage
| 
| align=center| 1
| align=center| 1:03
| Lafayette, Louisiana, United States
| 
|-
| Win
| align=center| 4–1
| Lance Everson
| Submission (armbar)
| MMA: Eruption
| 
| align=center| 1
| align=center| 3:02
| Lowell, Massachusetts, United States
| 
|-
| Win
| align=center| 3–1
| James Pokluda
| Submission
| Renegades Extreme Fighting
| 
| align=center| 1
| align=center| 2:22
| Houston, Texas, United States
| 
|-
| Win
| align=center| 2–1
| Bone Sayavonga
| KO
| Reality Combat Fighting 17
| 
| align=center| 1
| align=center| 0:13
| Lafayette, Louisiana, United States
| 
|-
| Loss
| align=center| 1–1
| Joey Villaseñor
| TKO (submission to punches)
| KOTC 13: Revolution
| 
| align=center| 2
| align=center| 3:24
| Reno, Nevada, United States
| 
|-
| Win
| align=center| 1–0
| Kevin Denz
| Submission (armbar)
| Rage in the Cage 26
| 
| align=center| 1
| align=center| 1:54
| Phoenix, Arizona, United States
|

References

External links

MySpace page

1977 births
Living people
American male mixed martial artists
Mixed martial artists from Louisiana
Middleweight mixed martial artists
Mixed martial artists utilizing judo
Mixed martial artists utilizing Brazilian jiu-jitsu
American practitioners of Brazilian jiu-jitsu
People awarded a black belt in Brazilian jiu-jitsu
Cajun sportspeople
American male judoka
Sportspeople from Lafayette, Louisiana
Ultimate Fighting Championship male fighters